The 1954 Louisville Cardinals football team was an American football team that represented the University of Louisville as an independent during the 1954 college football season. In their ninth season under head coach Frank Camp, the Cardinals compiled a 3–6 record. Johnny Unitas was the team captain.

Schedule

References

Louisville
Louisville Cardinals football seasons
Louisville Cardinals football